The SEAT 132 is a four door, rear wheel drive notchback saloon presented for the first time at the Barcelona Motor Show, assembled in Barcelona's Zona Franca, (Catalonia, Spain) and sold by SEAT between 1973 and 1982.

For the important taxi market, the 132 filled the niche, vacated with the withdrawal in 1970, of the diesel engined SEAT 1500, the 132 being usefully larger than the SEAT 124, which was SEAT's largest model during the beginning of the 1970s.

SEAT's new car shared its body with the Fiat 132, but when launched in May 1973 it featured its own engine options:

 The SEAT 132 Diesel featured a two litre  Mercedes Benz engine, corresponding to that offered in the Mercedes Benz 200D. This followed the pattern established with the SEAT 1500, which had also been available with a diesel engine from Mercedes Benz.

In 1976, an automatic transmission option was offered, which may have been a response to the success in Spain of the locally assembled, and similarly enhanced Chrysler Two Litre. From 1979, the SEAT 132 2000 became available, with one four cylinder 1920 cc engine of : in due course, one larger 2.2 litre, four cylinder Mercedes diesel version was also offered.

In the beginning of the 1980s, extensive discussions concerning funding and control took place between the major share holder, the Government of Spain, and Fiat: SEAT needed major capital investment, which Fiat was not prepared to inject. The outcome, by 1982, was an end after nearly thirty years, to the relationship with Fiat.

Already in 1981, Fiat having by now switched to their new model, the  Argenta, production of the SEAT 132 ceased, after approximately 100,000 examples had been produced. No direct replacement in this class was, up until 2009, offered by the company. The SEAT Exeo could be seen as the belated replacement, however.

References

External links
 SEAT 132 history (Spanish)

132
1980s cars
Cars introduced in 1973
Rear-wheel-drive vehicles
Sedans
Cars of Spain